Marco Antonio Raupp (9 July 1938 – 24 July 2021) was a Brazilian mathematician and politician. He served as Director of the National Institute for Space Research, President of the Sociedade Brasileira para o Progresso da Ciência, and Minister of Science, Technology and Innovation.

Biography
Raupp studied at the Federal University of Rio Grande do Sul and held a PhD in mathematics from the University of Chicago. He was a professor at the University of São Paulo's Institute of Mathematics and Statistics and the University of Brasília.

For his contributions as head of the LNCC and his various professorships, Raupp became a Commander of the Order of Rio Branco and of the National Order of Scientific Merit. He later served as President of the Sociedade Brasileira de Matemática Aplicada e Computacional. He also served as President of the Brazilian Space Agency.

On 24 January 2012, Raupp was appointed by President Dilma Rousseff to be Minister of Science, Technology and Innovation, replacing Aloízio Mercadante. He left the position on 17 March 2014 following ministerial reforms led by President Rousseff.

On 10 July 2016, Raupp was involved in a serious traffic collision which caused him to undergo surgery and enter into a medically-induced coma.

Marco Antonio Raupp died of acute respiratory failure resulting from a brain tumor in São José dos Campos on 24 July 2021 at the age of 83.

References

1938 births
2021 deaths
Brazilian politicians
Brazilian mathematicians
Federal University of Rio Grande do Sul alumni
People from Rio Grande do Sul
University of Chicago alumni
Recipients of the National Order of Scientific Merit (Brazil)
Ministers of Science and Technology of Brazil